Passes-Dangereuses (until May 2009: Chute-des-Passes) is an unorganized territory in the Canadian province of Quebec, located between the Peribonka River on the east and the Mistassibi River on the west.

Geography

Toponymy
The territory was formed in January 1981, and was then known as "Lac-Saint-Jean-Ouest, partie Chute-des-Passes". This was shortened to Chute-des-Passes in August 1986. On May 23, 2009, the territory was renamed to Passes-Dangereuses in order to avoid confusion with the hamlet of Chute-des-Passes in the neighbouring Unorganized Territory of Mont-Valin.

The following year, this missionary used the First Nations name Katchiskataouakigs, also used by Bellin on his map of 1744. A map of Jonathan Carver from 1776 indicated "Falls and Rift" to characterize the place. Not until the end of the 19th century did the current toponym begin to appear on survey maps. In 1941, Alcan built at the head of these rapids a dam called Chute-des-Passes, forming Lake Peribonka behind it. The dam's name also refers to the nearby hamlet that formed the east side of the river, and was the former name of Passes-Dangereuses Territory.

Demographics
Population trend:
 Population in 2021: 210 (2016 to 2021 population change: 14.1%)
 Population in 2016: 184 
 Population in 2011: 226 
 Population in 2006: 174
 Population in 2001: 188
 Population in 1996: 192
 Population in 1991: 207

Private dwellings occupied by usual residents: 104 (total dwellings: 151)

References

Unorganized territories in Saguenay–Lac-Saint-Jean
Maria-Chapdelaine Regional County Municipality